The East Stroudsburg Warriors are the athletic teams that represent East Stroudsburg University of Pennsylvania, located in East Stroudsburg, Pennsylvania, in NCAA Division II intercollegiate sports.

The Warriors are members of the Pennsylvania State Athletic Conference (PSAC) for all eighteen varsity sports and have been members of the PSAC since its foundation in 1951.

Varsity teams

List of teams

Men's sports (7)
Baseball
Basketball
Cross country
Football
Soccer
Track and field
Wrestling

Women's sports (11)
Basketball
Cross country
Field hockey
Golf
Lacrosse
Soccer
Softball
Swimming and diving
Tennis
Track and field
Volleyball

Individual sports

Basketball
In 2018 the men's basketball team advanced to the Elite 8 quarterfinals.

Field hockey
 East Stroudsburg's 2001 women's field hockey team finished runner-up for the NCAA Division II Field Hockey Championship.
 East Stroudsburg's 2015 women's field hockey team won the NCAA Division II Field Hockey Championship.

Football
 East Stroudsburg's 2005 football team got to the Division II semi-finals & quarterback Jimmy Terwilliger won the Harlon Hill Trophy.
James Franklin, the current Head Coach of Penn State, was quarterback from 1991 to 1994.

Gymnastics
 East Stroudsburg won the 1983 & 1984 NCAA Division II Men's Gymnastics Championships (runner-up in 1982, fifth place in 1981).
 East Stroudsburg won the 1985 Eastern Intercollegiate Gymnastics League championship (runner-up in 1984, third place in 1983).

Men's soccer
 East Stroudsburg won the 1962 NAIA national men's soccer championship.
 East Stroudsburg's 1972 men's soccer team produced Division I All-American goalkeeper Bob Rigby.

Softball
 East Stroudsburg's softball team appeared in two Women's College World Series in 1975 and 1976.

Other sports
 East Stroudsburg's 2000 women's rugby team finished runner up for the rugby.
 East Stroudsburg's 2009 women's rugby team finished runner up for the NSCRO.
 East Stroudsburg's club archery team won numerous national collegiate team championships bestowed by the National Archery Association over an era extending into the 1970s.

References

External links
 

https://esu.desire2learn.com/